Madis Pärtel (born 1 November 1985) is a retired Estonian volleyball player, who was a member of the Estonia men's national volleyball team and Estonian club TTÜ. He currently works as a diplomat in agriculture for Estonia to the European Union and is a Hubert H. Humphrey Fellow.

Estonian national team
As a member of the senior Estonia men's national volleyball team, Pärtel competed at the 2015 Men's European Volleyball Championship.

Sporting achievements

Clubs
Baltic League
  2012/2013 - with TTÜ
  2014/2015 - with TTÜ

National championship
 2012/2013  Estonian Championship, with TTÜ
 2014/2015  Estonian Championship, with TTÜ

National cup
 2013/2014  Estonian Cup 2013, with TTÜ
 2014/2015  Estonian Cup 2014, with TTÜ

References

External links

1985 births
Living people
Estonian men's volleyball players
Place of birth missing (living people)